Love Is All You Need?  is a 2016 American drama film. It stars Emily Osment, Briana Evigan, Tyler Blackburn, Blake Cooper Griffin, and Jeremy Sisto. Kim Rocco Shields is adapting the film from a screenplay that she co-wrote with David Tillman. On January 27, 2016, the first trailer for the movie was released. Lexi DiBennedetto, star of the 2011 short the film is based on, reprises her role of Ashley. The film was released on iTunes on November 24, 2016.

Plot

In an alternate reality where homosexuality is the norm and heterosexuality is shunned, men and women typically only have sex during designated breeding periods for the sake of procreation and it is the societal expectation to raise children with a same-sex partner. Gender roles are also different, with major sports teams and religious leaders being largely female. The film cuts between two main stories, the first is of the forbidden romance between female college-quarterback Jude and her classmate Ryan, while the second follows preteen Emily Curtis, who develops a crush on her male playmate and struggles to fit in.

Jude Klein (Briana Evigan) is the star football player at the fictitious Western Indiana University, a highly religious school in an equally religious town. Her girlfriend Kelly (Emily Osment) is a popular sorority girl running for homecoming queen. Both are regular attendees at a local church and close with its fiercely heterophobic reverend, Rachel Duncan (Elisabeth Röhm).

While at a frat party, Jude meets Ryan Morris (Tyler Blackburn), a sports journalism major who is writing a story on her for the school magazine. The two begin meeting regularly at a broken down merry-go-round near campus. Ryan is hinted to be a closeted heterosexual and one night, after Ryan surprises her by fixing the merry-go-round, they kiss. Jude confides her feelings to Susan Miller (Ana Ortiz), the head of the newly formed Heterosexual Alliance Club at Western Indiana, who encourages her to come out to her friends and family. Jude is adamant about burying her feelings to not put her football career in jeopardy, but that evening, she and Ryan confess their love for each other and have sex. Kelly, who had grown suspicious and secretly followed Jude, sees them. Furious and heartbroken, she films them with her cell phone.

Jude breaks up with Kelly, but Kelly tells her to keep their split quiet for the sake of her homecoming campaign. Meanwhile, Ryan is kicked out of the fraternity he is rushing for refusing to play 7 Minutes in Heaven with another guy. Later on, Jude discovers that Kelly plastered her dorm hall with pictures of her and Ryan having sex. A distraught Jude leaves a voicemail for Ryan, telling him to get somewhere safe. That night, she prays to God, asking for a sign that her love for Ryan is not wrong, before finding a bible verse that sets her at ease. The news of her outing reaches the reverend, who plans to encourage her followers at the university to act violently.

The next night, Jude faces coldness from her teammates and hostility from the crowd at the homecoming game while Ryan cheers her on from afar. During the last play of the game, the other team gangs up on Jude, gravely injuring her. When Ryan attempts to go to her, he is cornered by his former fraternity brothers, who have been advised by Reverend Rachel to "snuff out sin wherever they see it." They take him to the merry-go-round and severely beat him. Jude awakens in the hospital with Susan at her side.

Emily Curtis' (Kyla Kennedy) story largely takes place after the events at the university. In one of the film's opening scenes, she goes with one of her mothers, Karen (Jenica Bergere), to welcome their new neighbors, Susan Miller and her presumed wife. They learn that Susan is married to a man and as they leave, Karen explains to Emily that her other mother, Vicki (Katherine LaNasa), would not want their family associating with heterosexuals.

Emily is cut from her junior high's football team and is comforted by classmate Ian Santilli (Jacob Rodier). They quickly realize they have a lot in common and begin having regular play-dates at her house despite harassment from Ian's older sister, Paula (Ava Allen). Both of them plan to try out for the titular roles in the school play, a heterosexual version of Shakespeare's Romeo and Julio. The drama teacher, Dave Thompson (Jermey Sisto), had rewritten the male Julio part to be a woman (Juliet), intending to promote tolerance. For that reason, Vicki is immensely disapproving of her participating in the play.

Thompson is fired after the school receives a flood of complaints about the play. Ian ends his friendship with Emily after realizing she is a heterosexual, not wanting anyone to think he is "like her." Already heartbroken, Emily is ambushed by Paula and her friends, who beat her up and write "HETERO" on her forehead. Emily returns home where Karen attempts to comfort her but Vicki orders her to go upstairs and get herself cleaned up. The two women argue, Vicki eventually saying that Emily is at risk of becoming another "Ryan Morris." Emily overhears the name and looks it up on her laptop computer. She finds a video taken by one of his assailants and learns that he is currently in a coma. Traumatized, Emily locks herself in her bathroom and furiously tries to wipe the "HETERO" label off of her forehead. As her distress grows, she becomes convinced that she will never find happiness or acceptance and decides to commit suicide by slitting her wrist in the full bathtub.

Meanwhile, the Santillis call the Curtis home to have Paula apologize to Emily. Karen goes upstairs to bring the phone to her daughter, notices the footage of Ryan's assault on the laptop, and finds that a sobbing Emily is unresponsive to her pleas to open the bathroom door. Panicked, Karen calls for Vicki, and the women break the door down just as Emily loses consciousness from blood loss. Karen drops the phone to the floor, and the film cuts to the Santillis, still on the line and listening to the chaos. A visibly distraught Ian gets up and runs out of the room, while Paula and their fathers sit in shock. Vicki pulls her daughter out of the tub as the screen fades to black.

The film cuts to a funeral, thought it is unclear whom it is for. Ian and his family are in attendance and so is Thompson and his husband. Susan and her husband sit with Jude. A series of flashbacks show that Emily surviving her suicide attempt, Susan's husband caring for her as her doctor, and Susan and a recovering Jude visiting her in the hospital. Emily is shown with her family at the funeral, her arm heavily bandaged, indicating the service is for Ryan, who succumbed to his injuries after Emily attempted to kill herself. 

Jude speaks at the servivce, thanking God for giving her Ryan and reciting a quote from Romeo and Julio. Emily and Jude comfort each other after the service, confirming to each other that heterosexual love is no different from homosexual love. As Emily is gently called away by her mothers, the film shows them are conversing with the Santillis and the Millers, implying that the two same-sex couples are growing accepting of their heterosexual neighbors.

Jude visits the prison, where Reverend Rachel is now serving a sentence for inciting the hate crime that led to Ryan's death. She reads from the bible page she found after asking for a sign from God - 1 Peter 4:8: Above all, love each other deeply, because love covers over a multitude of sins. The film ends with Jude sitting on the merry go round, repeatedly listening a voicemail Ryan left her during the homecoming game. He had called to let her know that he is safe and has a great view of her from where he is. The message ends with him telling her that he loves her and will see her soon.

Cast

Production
In October 15, 2014, it was reported that Emily Osment, Briana Evigan and Kyla Kenedy would be featured in the film. In October 21, 2014, Jeremy Sisto, Ana Ortiz, Katherine La Nasa, Jenica Bergere and Leonard Roberts joined the film main cast. In October 28, 2014, Tyler Blackburn joined the film.

The film was shot in Los Angeles in early October 2014.

References

External links
 
 Official Website

2016 films
Drama films based on actual events
American drama films
Films shot in Los Angeles
LGBT-related drama films
LGBT-related films based on actual events
2016 drama films
2016 LGBT-related films
2010s English-language films
2010s American films